Den Haag Moerwijk is a railway station in the Moerwijk district of The Hague, South Holland, Netherlands. It opened on 2 June 1996.

Train services
The following services stop at Den Haag Moerwijk:
4x per hour local service (Sprinter) The Hague - Rotterdam - Dordrecht. The Sprinter calls only twice per hour during evenings and on weekends.

Tram services
Tram line 16 stops at the station, this line runs from Wateringen to the city centre.

External links
NS website 
Dutch Public Transport journey planner 

Moerwijk
Railway stations opened in 1996
Railway stations on the Oude Lijn